Çırpılar can refer to:

 Çırpılar, Bayramiç
 Çırpılar, Yenice